The 1966 USC Trojans football team represented the University of Southern California (USC) in the 1966 NCAA University Division football season. In their seventh year under head coach John McKay, the Trojans compiled a 7–4 record (4–1 against conference opponents), won the Athletic Association of Western Universities (AAWU or Pac-8) championship, and outscored their opponents by a combined total of 199 to 128. The team was ranked #18 in the final Coaches Poll.

Quarterback Troy Winslow led the team in passing, completing 82 of 138 passes for 1,023 yards with 6 touchdowns and 5 interceptions.  Don McCall led the team in rushing with 127 carries for 560 yards and 5 touchdowns. Ron Drake led the team in receiving with 52 catches for 607 yards and four touchdowns.

Schedule

Game summaries

at Texas

at Miami (FL)

Notre Dame

Purdue (Rose Bowl)

References

USC
USC Trojans football seasons
Pac-12 Conference football champion seasons
USC Trojans football